Jin Ye-ju (born Kim Yeon-seo on 6 August 1996) is a South Korean actress.

Filmography

Television series

Web series

Film

Music video

References

External links 
  
 

1996 births
Living people
South Korean actresses
South Korean television actresses
FNC Entertainment artists